Canteen Brewhouse (formerly Il Vicino Brewing Company) is an American craft brewery founded in 1994 in Albuquerque, New Mexico.

History
Originally housed in the Albuquerque Nob Hill location of Il Vicino Wood Oven Pizza restaurant, founding partners Greg Atkin, Rick Post and Thomas White, along with former partner Tom Hennessy, currently the founder of Colorado Boy Brewing, recognized restaurant customer wishes for craft beer to go with their pizza. They created their first beer, Old Route 66 Golden Ale, in December 1993.

After a few months, Hennessy needed help with the growing brewing endeavor, recruiting Brady McKeown, then a University of New Mexico student. McKeown studied under Hennessy, receiving ground-up education in craft brewing, eventually becoming Il Vicino's Head Brewer. In 1995, Il Vicino's Wet Mountain IPA earned the young brewers their first Great American Beer Festival medal, starting a nearly two-decade progression of achievements for the brewery and McKeown.

In 2011, the partners opened the Il Vicino Brewery (IVB) Canteen taproom in Albuquerque's Brewery District. The 6,500-square-foot brewing facility also features an outdoor patio, food menu and live music.

Awards
Canteen Brewhouse/Il Vicino Brewing Company has garnered 13 Great American Beer Festival medals, seven World Beer Cup medals, and is a six-time winner of the New Mexico IPA Challenge.

In all, the brewery has won over 115 local, national and international awards, and is the oldest Albuquerque
brewery still in business.

Most recently, Canteen Brewhouse won two awards at the 2014 Great American Beer Festival - Gold Medal in the American-Style Amber/Red Ale category for Dougie Style Amber Ale, and Silver Medal in the Aged Beer category for Saint Bob's Imperial Stout '07.

Name change
In September 2014, Il Vicino Brewing Company changed their name to Canteen Brewhouse.

See also

 Albuquerque craft beer market
 List of breweries in New Mexico
 List of microbreweries

Notes

References

External links
 

Beer brewing companies based in New Mexico
Manufacturing companies based in Albuquerque, New Mexico
Buildings and structures in Albuquerque, New Mexico
Drinking establishments in New Mexico
Restaurants in Albuquerque, New Mexico
American companies established in 1994
Food and drink companies established in 1994
1994 establishments in New Mexico
Tourist attractions in Albuquerque, New Mexico